Gilli Wala is a village in Punjab, Pakistan,  east-northeast of Gujrat city,  north of Lahore, the capital city of the province, and  southeast of Islamabad, the national capital city of Pakistan.

Geography and climate
Gilli Wala is situated on the North bank of Chenab River in a fertile region along the river valleys, in the North Western edge of the geologic Indian Plate in South Asia. The village has a moderate climate. During the winter, the minimum temperature may fall below . The surrounding lands are cultivated with rice, wheat and sugarcane. The Village have two Masjids , two Primary schools one for girls and another for boys, one High school and also higher secondary school for girls.

References

Populated places in Gujrat District